Uči me majko, karaj me (() is a traditional folk song from the region of Macedonia.

It was published for the first time by the  Bulgarian National Revival activists Miladinov Brothers in their collection Bulgarian Folk Songs in 1861. This song is remembered in its folk rendition mostly by the ethnic Macedonian folk singer Aleksandar Sarievski, while the band Leb i Sol have arranged a modern rock version. The song is also performed by Macedonian singer Tose Proeski and Bulgarian singer Kiril Kostov.

Notes

Bulgarian folk songs
Macedonian folk songs
Songs about mothers
Year of song unknown
Songwriter unknown